Thanksgiving is a federal holiday in the United States celebrated on the fourth Thursday of November. It is sometimes called American Thanksgiving (outside the United States) to distinguish it from the Canadian holiday of the same name and related celebrations in other regions. It originated as a day of thanksgiving and harvest festival, with the theme of the holiday revolving around giving thanks and the centerpiece of Thanksgiving celebrations remaining a Thanksgiving dinner. The dinner traditionally consists of foods and dishes indigenous to the Americas, namely turkey, potatoes (usually mashed or sweet), stuffing, squash, corn (maize), green beans, cranberries (typically in sauce form), and pumpkin pie. Other Thanksgiving customs include charitable organizations offering Thanksgiving dinner for the poor, attending religious services, and watching television events such as Macy's Thanksgiving Day Parade and NFL football games. Thanksgiving is regarded as the beginning of the Christmas and holiday season, with the day following it, Black Friday, being the busiest shopping day of the year in the United States.

New England and Virginia colonists originally celebrated days of fasting, as well as days of thanksgiving, thanking God for blessings such as harvests, ship landings, military victories, or the end of a drought. These were observed through church services, accompanied with feasts and other communal gatherings.
The event that Americans commonly call the "first Thanksgiving" was celebrated by the Pilgrims after their first harvest in the New World in October 1621. This feast lasted three days and was attended by 90 Native American Wampanoag people
and 53 survivors of the Mayflower (Pilgrims). Less widely known is an earlier Thanksgiving celebration in Virginia in 1619 by English settlers who had just landed at Berkeley Hundred aboard the ship Margaret.

Thanksgiving has been celebrated nationally on and off since 1789, with a proclamation by President George Washington after a request by Congress. President Thomas Jefferson chose not to observe the holiday, and its celebration was intermittent until President Abraham Lincoln, in 1863, proclaimed a national day of "Thanksgiving and Praise to our beneficent Father who dwelleth in the Heavens", calling on the American people to also, "with humble penitence for our national perverseness and disobedience ... fervently implore the interposition of the Almighty hand to heal the wounds of the nation ...".  Lincoln declared it for the last Thursday in November. On June 28, 1870, President Ulysses S. Grant signed into law the Holidays Act that made Thanksgiving a yearly appointed federal holiday in Washington D.C. On January 6, 1885, an act by Congress made Thanksgiving, and other federal holidays, a paid holiday for all federal workers throughout the United States. Under President Franklin D. Roosevelt, the date was moved to one week earlier, observed between 1939 and 1941 amid significant controversy. From 1942 onwards, Thanksgiving, by an act of Congress received a permanent observation date, the fourth Thursday in November, no longer at the discretion of the President.

History

Early thanksgiving observances

Setting aside time to give thanks for one's blessings, along with holding feasts to celebrate a harvest, are both practices that long predate the European settlement of North America. The Puritans observed days of fasting to pray for God's favour, as well as days of thanksgiving to thank God for a bountiful harvest, victory and other joyous occasions. Documented thanksgiving services in territory currently belonging to the United States were conducted in the 16th century by Spaniards and the French. These days of thanksgiving were celebrated through church services and feasting. Historian Michael Gannon claimed St. Augustine, Florida was founded with a shared thanksgiving meal on September 8, 1565.

Thanksgiving services were routine in what became the Commonwealth of Virginia as early as 1607; the first permanent settlement of Jamestown, Virginia held a thanksgiving in 1610. On December 4, 1619, 38 English settlers celebrated a thanksgiving immediately upon landing at Berkeley Hundred in Charles City County, Virginia. The group's London Company charter specifically required, "that the day of our ships arrival at the place assigned for plantation in the land of Virginia shall be yearly and perpetually kept holy as a day of thanksgiving to Almighty God." This celebration has, since the mid 20th century, been commemorated there annually at present-day Berkeley Plantation, the ancestral home of the Harrison family of Virginia.

Harvest festival observed by the Pilgrims at Plymouth
The Plymouth settlers, known as Pilgrims, had settled in a land abandoned when all but one of the Patuxet Indians died in a disease outbreak. After a harsh winter killed half of the Plymouth settlers, the last surviving Patuxet, Tisquantum, more commonly known by the diminutive variant Squanto (who had learned English and avoided the plague as a slave in Europe), came in at the request of Samoset, the first Native American to encounter the Pilgrims. Squanto taught the Pilgrims how to catch eel and grow corn and served as an interpreter for them until he too succumbed to the disease a year later. The Wampanoag leader Massasoit also gave food to the colonists during the first winter when supplies brought from England were insufficient. Massasoit had hoped to establish an alliance between the Wampanoag, themselves greatly weakened by the same plague that extirpated the Patuxet, and the better-armed English in their long-running rivalry with a Narragansett tribe that had largely been spared from the epidemic; the tribe reasoned that, given that the Pilgrims had brought women and children, they had not arrived to wage war against them.

The Pilgrims celebrated at Plymouth for three days after their first harvest in 1621. The exact time is unknown, but James Baker, the Plimoth Plantation vice president of research, stated in 1996, "The event occurred between Sept. 21 and Nov. 11, 1621, with the most likely time being around Michaelmas (Sept. 29), the traditional time." Seventeenth-century accounts do not identify this as a Thanksgiving observance, rather it followed the harvest. It included 50 people who were on the Mayflower (all who remained of the 100 who had landed) and 90 Native Americans. The feast was cooked by the four adult Pilgrim women who survived their first winter in the New World (Eleanor Billington, Elizabeth Hopkins, Mary Brewster, and Susanna White), along with young daughters and male and female servants. According to accounts by Wampanoag descendants, the harvest was originally set up for the Pilgrims alone; the surviving natives, hearing celebratory gunfire and fearing war, arrived to see the feast and were warmly welcomed to join the celebration, contributing their own foods to the meal.

Two colonists gave personal accounts of the 1621 feast in Plymouth. The Pilgrims, most of whom were Separatists (English Dissenters), are not to be confused with Puritans, who established their own Massachusetts Bay Colony on the Shawmut Peninsula (current day Boston) in 1630. Both groups were strict Calvinists, but differed in their views regarding the Church of England. Puritans wished to remain in the Anglican Church and reform it, while the Pilgrims wanted complete separation from the church.

William Bradford, in Of Plymouth Plantation wrote:

Edward Winslow, in Mourt's Relation wrote:

The Pilgrims held a true Thanksgiving celebration in 1623 following a fast and a refreshing 14 day rain, which resulted in a larger harvest. William DeLoss Love calculates that this thanksgiving was made on Wednesday, July 30, 1623, a day before the arrival of a supply ship with more colonists, but before the fall harvest. In Love's opinion, this 1623 thanksgiving was significant because the order to recognize the event was from civil authority
(Governor Bradford), and not from the church, making it likely the first civil recognition of Thanksgiving in New England.

Referring to the 1623 harvest after the nearly catastrophic drought, Bradford wrote:

These firsthand accounts do not appear to have contributed to the early development of the holiday. Bradford's "Of Plymouth Plantation" was not published until the 1850s. The booklet "Mourt's Relation" was summarized by other publications without the now-familiar thanksgiving story. By the eighteenth century, the original booklet appeared to be lost or forgotten; a copy was rediscovered in Philadelphia in 1820, with the first full reprinting in 1841. In a footnote the editor, Alexander Young, was the first person to identify the 1621 feast as the first Thanksgiving.

Debate over the first Thanksgiving

According to historian James Baker, debates over where any "first Thanksgiving" took place on modern American territory are a "tempest in a beanpot". Jeremy Bang opines that, "Local boosters in Virginia, Florida, and Texas promote their own colonists, who (like many people getting off a boat) gave thanks for setting foot again on dry land." Baker claims, "the American holiday's true origin was the New England Calvinist Thanksgiving. Never coupled with a Sabbath meeting, the Puritan observances were special days set aside during the week for thanksgiving and praise in response to God's providence."

However, the 1619 codification and celebration of an annual thanksgiving according to the Berkeley Hundred charter in Virginia prompted President John F. Kennedy to acknowledge the claims of both Massachusetts and Virginia to America's earliest celebrations. He issued Proclamation 3560 on November 5, 1963, saying: "Over three centuries ago, our forefathers in Virginia and in Massachusetts, far from home in a lonely wilderness, set aside a time of thanksgiving. On the appointed day, they gave reverent thanks for their safety, for the health of their children, for the fertility of their fields, for the love which bound them together and for the faith which united them with their God."

The Revolutionary War

The First National Proclamation of Thanksgiving was given by the Continental Congress in 1777 from its temporary location in York, Pennsylvania, while the British occupied the national capital at Philadelphia. Delegate Samuel Adams created the first draft. Congress then adopted the final version:For as much as it is the indispensable Duty of all Men to adore the superintending Providence of Almighty God; to acknowledge with Gratitude their Obligation to him for Benefits received, and to implore such farther Blessings as they stand in Need of: And it had pleased him in his abundant Mercy, not only to continue to us the innumerable Bounties of his common Providence; but also to smile upon us in the Prosecution of a just and necessary war, for the Defense and Establishment of our unalienable Rights and Liberties; particularly in that he hath been pleased, in so great a Measure, to prosper the Means used for the Support of our Troops, and to crown our Arms with most signal success:

It is therefore recommended to the legislative or executive Powers of these United States to set apart Thursday, the eighteenth Day of December next, for Solemn Thanksgiving and Praise: That at one Time and with one Voice, the good People may express the grateful Feelings of their Hearts, and consecrate themselves to the Service of their Divine Benefactor; and that, together with their sincere Acknowledgments and Offerings, they may join the penitent Confession of their manifold Sins, whereby they had forfeited every Favor; and their humble and earnest Supplication that it may please God through the Merits of Jesus Christ, mercifully to forgive and blot them out of Remembrance; That it may please him graciously to afford his Blessing on the Governments of these States respectively, and prosper the public Council of the whole: To inspire our Commanders, both by Land and Sea, and all under them, with that Wisdom and Fortitude which may render them fit Instruments, under the Providence of Almighty God, to secure for these United States, the greatest of all human Blessings, Independence and Peace: That it may please him, to prosper the Trade and Manufactures of the People, and the Labor of the Husbandman, that our Land may yield its Increase: To take Schools and Seminaries of Education, so necessary for cultivating the Principles of true Liberty, Virtue and Piety, under his nurturing Hand; and to prosper the Means of Religion, for the promotion and enlargement of that Kingdom, which consisteth "in Righteousness, Peace and Joy in the Holy Ghost.

And it is further recommended, That servile Labor, and such Recreation, as, though at other Times innocent, may be unbecoming the Purpose of this Appointment, be omitted on so solemn an Occasion.George Washington, leader of the revolutionary forces in the American Revolutionary War, proclaimed a Thanksgiving in December 1777 as a victory celebration honoring the defeat of the British at Saratoga.

Thanksgiving proclamations in the early Republic

The Continental Congress, the legislative body that governed the United States from 1774 to 1789, issued several "national days of prayer, humiliation, and thanksgiving", a practice that was continued by presidents Washington and Adams under the Constitution, and has manifested itself in the established American observances of Thanksgiving and the National Day of Prayer today. This proclamation was published in The Independent Gazetteer, or the Chronicle of Freedom, on November 5, 1782, the first being observed on November 28, 1782:

By the United States in Congress assembled,
PROCLAMATION.

It being the indispensable duty of all nations, not only to offer up their supplications to Almighty God, the giver of all good, for His gracious assistance in a time of distress, but also in a solemn and public manner, to give Him praise for His goodness in general, and especially for great and signal interpositions of His Providence in their behalf; therefore, the United States in Congress assembled, taking into their consideration the many instances of Divine goodness to these States in the course of the important conflict, in which they have been so long engaged; the present happy and promising state of public affairs, and the events of the war in the course of the year now drawing to a close; particularly the harmony of the public Councils which is so necessary to the success of the public cause; the perfect union and good understanding which has hitherto subsisted between them and their allies, notwithstanding the artful and unwearied attempts of the common enemy to divide them; the success of the arms of the United States and those of their allies; and the acknowledgment of their Independence by another European power, whose friendship and commerce must be of great and lasting advantage to these States; Do hereby recommend it to the inhabitants of these States in general, to observe and request the several states to interpose their authority, in appointing and commanding the observation of THURSDAY the TWENTY-EIGHTH DAY OF NOVEMBER next as a day of SOLEMN THANKSGIVING to GOD for all His mercies; and they do further recommend to all ranks to testify their gratitude to God for His goodness by a cheerful obedience to His laws and by promoting, each in his station, and by his influence, the practice of true and undefiled religion, which is the great foundation of public prosperity and national happiness.

Done in Congress at Philadelphia, the eleventh day of October, in the year of our LORD, one thousand seven hundred and eighty-two, and of our Sovereignty and Independence, the seventh.

JOHN HANSON, President.
CHARLES THOMSON, Secretary.

On Thursday, September 24, 1789, the first House of Representatives voted to recommend the First Amendment of the newly drafted Constitution to the states for ratification. The next day, Congressman Elias Boudinot from New Jersey proposed that the House and Senate jointly request of President Washington to proclaim a day of thanksgiving for "the many signal favors of Almighty God". Boudinot said he "could not think of letting the session pass over without offering an opportunity to all the citizens of the United States of joining, with one voice, in returning to Almighty God their sincere thanks for the many blessings he had poured down upon them."

As President, on October 3, 1789, George Washington made the following proclamation and created the first Thanksgiving Day designated by the national government of the United States of America:

On January 1, 1795, Washington proclaimed a Thanksgiving Day to be observed on Thursday, February 19.

President John Adams declared Thanksgivings in 1798 and 1799.

As Thomas Jefferson was a deist and a skeptic of the idea of divine intervention, he did not declare any thanksgiving days during his presidency, giving his reasons thus:
Gentlemen,

The affectionate sentiments of esteem and approbation which you are so good as to express towards me, on behalf of the Danbury Baptist association, give me the highest satisfaction.  My duties dictate a faithful and zealous pursuit of the interests of my constituents, & in proportion as they are persuaded of my fidelity to those duties, the discharge of them becomes more & more pleasing.

Believing with you that religion is a matter which lies solely between Man & his God, that he owes account to none other for his faith or his worship, that the legitimate powers of government reach actions only, & not opinions, I contemplate with sovereign reverence that act of the whole American people which declared that their legislature should "make no law respecting an establishment of religion, or prohibiting the free exercise thereof," thus building a wall of separation between Church & State.  Adhering to this expression of the supreme will of the nation in behalf of the rights of conscience, I shall see with sincere satisfaction the progress of those sentiments which tend to restore to man all his natural rights, convinced he has no natural right in opposition to his social duties.

I reciprocate your kind prayers for the protection & blessing of the common father and creator of man, and tender you for yourselves & your religious association, assurances of my high respect & esteem.

Th. Jefferson, Jan 1. 1802 

James Madison renewed the tradition in 1814, in response to resolutions of Congress, at the close of the War of 1812. Caleb Strong, Governor of the Commonwealth of Massachusetts, declared the holiday in 1813, "for a day of public thanksgiving and prayer" for Thursday, November 25 of that year.

Madison also declared the holiday twice in 1815; however, neither of these was celebrated in autumn. In 1816, Governor Plumer of New Hampshire appointed Thursday, November 14 to be observed as a day of Public Thanksgiving and Governor Brooks of Massachusetts appointed Thursday, November 28 to be "observed throughout that State as a day of Thanksgiving".

A thanksgiving day was annually appointed by the governor of New York, De Witt Clinton, in 1817. In 1830, the New York State Legislature officially sanctioned thanksgiving as a holiday, making New York the first state outside of New England to do so.

In 1846, Sara Josepha Hale began a campaign to make Thanksgiving a national holiday, to be held on the last Thursday in November. She wrote to presidents, members of Congress, and every governor of every state and territory for the next seventeen years to promote the idea, as well as popularizing it in her books and editorials.  Hale hoped that Thanksgiving, as a national holiday, would foster the “moral and social reunion of Americans”. She also proposed that churches mark the holiday by collecting funds for the purchasing of slaves and their education and repatriation back to Africa.
By 1860 proclamations appointing a day of thanksgiving were issued by the governors of thirty states and three territories.

Lincoln and the Civil War

In the middle of the American Civil War, President Abraham Lincoln, prompted by a series of editorials written by Sarah Josepha Hale, proclaimed a national Thanksgiving Day, to be celebrated on the 26th, the final Thursday of November 1863. The document, written by Secretary of State William H. Seward, reads as follows:

Since 1863, Thanksgiving has been observed annually in the United States. The holiday superseded Evacuation Day, a de facto national holiday that had been held on November 25 each year prior to the Civil War and commemorated the British withdrawal from the United States after the American Revolution.

Post-Civil War era

On June 28, 1870, President Ulysses S. Grant signed into law the Holidays Act that made Thanksgiving a yearly "appointed or remembered" federal holiday in Washington D.C. Three other holidays included in the law were New Year, Christmas, and July 4. The law did not extend outside of Washington D.C., while the date assigned for Thanksgiving was left to the discretion of the President. In January 1879, George Washington's Birthday, February 22, was added by Congress to the federal holidays list. On January 6, 1885, a Congressional act expanded the Holidays Act to apply to all federal departments and employees throughout the nation. Federal workers received pay for all the holidays, including Thanksgiving.

During the second half of the 19th century, Thanksgiving traditions in America varied from region to region. A traditional New England Thanksgiving, for example, consisted of a raffle held on Thanksgiving Eve (in which the prizes were mainly geese or turkeys), a shooting match on Thanksgiving morning (in which turkeys and chickens were used as targets), church services — and then the traditional feast, which consisted of some familiar Thanksgiving staples such as turkey and pumpkin pie, and some not-so-familiar dishes such as pigeon pie. The earliest high school football rivalries took root in the late 19th century in Massachusetts, stemming from games played on Thanksgiving; professional football took root as a Thanksgiving staple during the sport's genesis in the 1890s, and the tradition of Thanksgiving football both at the high school and professional level continues to this day. The Southern United States had long resisted adopting the holiday before largely accepting it with the increased influence of football on the day.

In New York City, people would dress up in fanciful masks and costumes and roam the streets in merry-making mobs. By the beginning of the 20th century, these mobs had morphed into Ragamuffin parades consisting mostly of children dressed as "ragamuffins" in costumes of old and mismatched adult clothes and with deliberately smudged faces, but by the late 1950s the tradition had diminished enough to only exist in its original form in a few communities around New York, with many of its traditions subsumed into the Halloween custom of trick-or-treating.

Franksgiving (1939–1941)

Abraham Lincoln's successors as president followed his example of annually declaring the final Thursday in November to be Thanksgiving. But in 1939, President Franklin D. Roosevelt broke with this tradition. November had five Thursdays that year (instead of the more-common four), Roosevelt declared the fourth Thursday as Thanksgiving rather than the fifth one. Although many popular histories state otherwise, he made clear that his plan was to establish the holiday on the next-to-last Thursday in the month instead of the last one. With the country still in the midst of The Great Depression, Roosevelt thought an earlier Thanksgiving would give merchants a longer period to sell goods before Christmas. Increasing profits and spending during this period, Roosevelt hoped, would help bring the country out of the Depression. At the time, advertising goods for Christmas before Thanksgiving was considered inappropriate. Fred Lazarus, Jr., founder of the Federated Department Stores (later Macy's), is credited with convincing Roosevelt to push Thanksgiving to a week earlier to expand the shopping season, and within two years the change passed through Congress into law.

Republicans decried the change, calling it an affront to the memory of Lincoln. People began referring to November 30 as the "Republican Thanksgiving" and November 23 as the "Democratic Thanksgiving" or "Franksgiving".

1942 to present

On October 6, 1941, both houses of the United States Congress passed a joint resolution fixing the traditional last-Thursday date for the holiday beginning in 1942. However, in December of that year the Senate passed an amendment to the resolution that split the difference by requiring that Thanksgiving be observed annually on the fourth Thursday of November, in order to prevent confusion on the occasional years in which November has five Thursdays. The amendment also passed the House, and on December 26, 1941, President Roosevelt signed this bill, for the first time making the date of Thanksgiving a matter of federal law and fixing the day as the fourth Thursday of November.

Traditional celebrations and solemnities

Foods of the season

The centerpiece of most Thanksgiving celebrations is the Thanksgiving dinner, consisting mainly of foods native to the Americas.

Turkey, usually roasted and stuffed (but sometimes deep-fried instead), is typically the featured item on most Thanksgiving feast tables. 40 million turkeys were consumed on Thanksgiving Day alone in 2019. With 85 percent of Americans partaking in the meal, an estimated 276 million Americans dine on the festive poultry, spending an expected $1.05 billion on turkeys for Thanksgiving in 2016.

Mashed potatoes with gravy, stuffing, sweet potatoes, cranberry sauce, sweet corn, various fall vegetables, squash, and pumpkin pie are among the side dishes commonly associated with Thanksgiving dinner. All these are actually native to the Americas or were introduced as a new food source to the Europeans when they arrived. Turkey may be an exception. Philbrick (2006) suggests that the Pilgrims might already have been familiar with turkey in England, even though the bird is native to the Americas. The Spaniards had brought domesticated turkeys back from Central America in the early 17th century, and the birds soon became popular fare all over Europe, including England, where turkey (as an alternative to the traditional goose) became a "fixture at English Christmases".

The Pilgrims did not observe Christmas, as they could find no evidence in the scriptures as to when such a holiday should be celebrated and felt its December scheduling was a spurious Roman Catholic invention.

As a result of the size of Thanksgiving dinner, Americans eat more food on Thanksgiving than on any other day of the year.

Thanksgiving dinners tend to be shorter when the participants have political differences.

Giving thanks

Thanksgiving was founded as a religious observance for all the members of the community for a common purpose to give thanks to God. A 1541 thanksgiving mass was held by the Spanish explorer Francisco Vásquez de Coronado and his expedition of 1,500 men at Palo Duro Canyon in what is today the Texas Panhandle. A thanksgiving took place after the victory in the 1777 Battle of Saratoga during the Revolutionary War. In his 1789 National Thanksgiving Proclamation, President Washington gave many noble reasons for a national Thanksgiving, including "for the civil and religious liberty", for "useful knowledge", and for God's "kind care" and "His Providence".

The tradition of giving thanks to God is continued today in many forms, most notably the attendance of religious services, as well as the saying of a mealtime prayer before Thanksgiving dinner. Many houses of worship offer worship services and events on Thanksgiving themes the weekend before, the day of, or the weekend after Thanksgiving. At home, it is a holiday tradition in many families to begin the Thanksgiving dinner by saying grace (a prayer before or after a meal). The custom is portrayed in the photograph "Family Holding Hands and Praying Before a Thanksgiving Meal". Before praying, it is a common practice at the dining table for "each person [to] tell one specific reason they're thankful to God that year". While grace is said, some families hold hands until the prayer concludes, often indicated with an "Amen".

Joy Fisher, a Baptist writer, states that "this holiday takes on a spiritual emphasis and includes recognition of the source of the blessings they enjoy year round — a loving God." In the same vein, Hesham A. Hassaballa, an American Muslim scholar and physician, has written that Thanksgiving "is wholly consistent with Islamic principles" and that "few things are more Islamic than thanking God for His blessings". Similarly many Sikh Americans also celebrate the holiday by "giving thanks to Almighty".

Penitence and prayer 

Thanksgiving is included in the Revised Common Lectionary, which provides scriptures for Thanksgiving services. It is the last entry on the liturgical calendar before the start of Advent the following Sunday.

Charity

The poor are often provided with food at Thanksgiving time. Most communities have annual food drives that collect non-perishable packaged and canned foods, and corporations sponsor charitable distributions of staple foods and Thanksgiving dinners. The Salvation Army enlists volunteers to serve Thanksgiving dinners to hundreds of people in different locales. Additionally, pegged to be five days after Thanksgiving is Giving Tuesday, a celebration of charitable giving.

Parades

Since 1924, in New York City, the Macy's Thanksgiving Day Parade is held annually every Thanksgiving Day from the Upper West Side of Manhattan to Macy's flagship store in Herald Square, and televised nationally by NBC. The parade features parade floats with specific themes, performances from Broadway musicals, large balloons of cartoon characters, TV personalities, and high school marching bands. The float that traditionally ends the Macy's Parade is the Santa Claus float, the arrival of which is an unofficial sign of the beginning of the Christmas season. It is billed as the world's largest parade.

The oldest Thanksgiving Day parade is Philadelphia's Thanksgiving Day Parade, which launched in 1920. Philadelphia's parade was long associated with Gimbels, a prominent Macy's rival, until that store closed in 1986.

Founded in 1924, the same year as the Macy's parade, America's Thanksgiving Parade in Detroit is one of the largest parades in the country. The parade runs from Midtown to Downtown Detroit and precedes the annual Detroit Lions Thanksgiving football game.  The parade includes large balloons, marching bands, and various celebrity guests much like the Macy's parade and is nationally televised on various affiliate stations. The Mayor of Detroit closes the parade by giving Santa Claus a key to the city.

There are Thanksgiving parades in many other cities, including:
 Ameren Missouri Thanksgiving Day Parade (St. Louis, Missouri)
 America's Hometown Thanksgiving Parade (Plymouth, Massachusetts)
 Belk Carolinas' Carrousel Parade (Charlotte, North Carolina)
 Celebrate the Season Parade (Pittsburgh, Pennsylvania)
 FirstLight Federal Credit Union Sun Bowl Parade (El Paso, Texas)
 H-E-B Holiday Parade (Houston, Texas)
 Chicago Thanksgiving Parade (Chicago, Illinois)
 Santa Claus Parade (Peoria, Illinois), the nation's oldest, dating to 1887 and held the day after Thanksgiving
 Parada de los Cerros Thanksgiving Day Parade (Fountain Hills, Arizona)

Most of these parades are televised on a local station, and some have small, usually regional, syndication networks; most also carry the parades via Internet television on the TV stations' websites.

Several other parades have a loose association with Thanksgiving, thanks to CBS's now-discontinued All-American Thanksgiving Day Parade coverage. Parades that were covered during this era were the Aloha Floral Parade held in Honolulu, Hawaii every September, the Toronto Santa Claus Parade in Toronto, Ontario, Canada, and the Opryland Aqua Parade (held from 1996 to 2001 by the Gaylord Opryland Resort & Convention Center in Nashville); the Opryland parade was discontinued and replaced by a taped parade in Miami Beach, Florida in 2002.

For many years the Santa Claus Lane Parade (now Hollywood Christmas Parade) in Los Angeles was held on the Wednesday evening before Thanksgiving. In 1978 this was switched to the Sunday following the holiday.

Sports

American football

American football is an important part of many Thanksgiving celebrations in the United States, a tradition that dates to the earliest era of the sport in the late 19th century. Professional football games are often held on Thanksgiving Day; until recently, these were the only games played during the week apart from Sunday or Monday night. The National Football League has played games on Thanksgiving every year since its creation except during World War II. The Detroit Lions have hosted a game every Thanksgiving Day from 1934 to 1938 and again every year since 1945. In 1966, the Dallas Cowboys, which were founded six years earlier, adopted the practice of hosting Thanksgiving games. The league added a third game in primetime in 2006; unlike the traditional afternoon doubleheader, this game has no fixed host.

For college football teams that participate in the highest level (all teams in the Football Bowl Subdivision, as well as three teams in the historically black Southwestern Athletic Conference of the Championship Subdivision), the regular season ends on Thanksgiving weekend, and a team's final game is often against a regional or historic rival, such as the Iron Bowl between Alabama and Auburn, the rivalry formerly known as the Oregon Civil War between Oregon and Oregon State, the Apple Cup between Washington and Washington State, and Michigan and Ohio State playing in their rivalry game.

Some high school football games (which include some state championship games), and informal "Turkey Bowl" contests played by amateur groups and organizations, are frequently held on Thanksgiving weekend. Games of football preceding or following the meal in the backyard or a nearby field are also common during many family gatherings. Amateur games typically follow less organized backyard-rules, two-hand touch or flag football styles.

Other sports
College basketball holds several elimination tournaments on over Thanksgiving weekend, before the conference season. These include the Anaheim-based Wooden Legacy, the Orlando-based AdvoCare Invitational, and the Bahamas-based Battle 4 Atlantis, all of which are televised on ESPN2 and ESPNU in marathon format. The NCAA owned-and-operated NIT Season Tip-Off has also since moved to Thanksgiving week.

Though golf and auto racing are in their off-seasons on Thanksgiving, there are events in those sports that take place on Thanksgiving weekend. The Turkey Night Grand Prix is an annual automobile race that takes place at various venues in southern California on Thanksgiving night; due in part to the fact that this is after the Monster Energy NASCAR Cup Series and IndyCar Series have finished their seasons, it allows some of the top racers in the United States to participate. In golf, Thanksgiving weekend was the traditional time of the Skins Game from 1983 to 2008.

The world championship pumpkin chunking contest was held in early November in Delaware and televised each Thanksgiving on Science Channel, but the event was mired in liability disputes following injuries at the events in the 2010s; it has been held only once since 2016, a 2019 contest in Illinois that had far fewer competitors and ran a financial loss.

In ice hockey, the National Hockey League announced, as part of its decade-long extension with NBC, that they would begin airing a game on the Friday afternoon following Thanksgiving beginning the 2011–12 NHL season; the game has since been branded as the "Thanksgiving Showdown". (The Boston Bruins have played matinees on Black Friday since at least 1990, but 2011 was the first time the game was nationally televised.) 

Professional wrestling promotions have typically held premier pay-per-view events on or around the time of Thanksgiving. This trend began in 1983 when Jim Crockett Promotions, the largest promoter in the National Wrestling Alliance, introduced Starrcade. Starrcade, later incorporated into World Championship Wrestling, moved off Thanksgiving in 1988; the year prior, the rival World Wrestling Federation had introduced Survivor Series, an event that continues to be hosted in November to the present day.

Many American cities hold road running events, known as "turkey trots", on Thanksgiving morning, so much so that , Thanksgiving is the most popular race day in the U.S. Depending on the organizations involved, these can range from one-mile (1.6 km) fun runs to full marathons (although no races currently use the latter; the Atlanta Marathon stopped running on Thanksgiving in 2010).

In soccer, Major League Soccer announced in 2021 that a MLS Cup Playoffs match will be held on Thanksgiving for the first time, with a Conference Semifinals match of the 2021 Playoffs between the Colorado Rapids and the Portland Timbers held on that day. While the MLS Cup playoffs were usually held from October to December, no MLS match was held on a Thanksgiving Day before 2021. There will be no MLS Cup Playoff match expected to take place on Thanksgiving in 2022 to avoid conflicts with the 2022 FIFA World Cup which also begins days before Thanksgiving. That MLS Cup match that would air on Fox will be determined by the year Fox has the early NFL game or late NFL game for their "Football-Futbol Doubleheader" format.

Television

While not as prolific as Christmas specials, which usually begin right after Thanksgiving, there are many special television programs transmitted on or around Thanksgiving, such as A Charlie Brown Thanksgiving, in addition to the live parades and football games mentioned above. In some cases, television broadcasters begin programming Christmas films and specials to run on Thanksgiving Day, taking the day as a signal for the beginning of the Christmas season.

Radio

"Alice's Restaurant", an 18-minute monologue by Arlo Guthrie which is partially based on an incident that happened on Thanksgiving in 1965, was first released in 1967. It has since become a tradition on numerous classic rock and classic hits radio stations to play the full, uninterrupted recording to much fanfare each Thanksgiving Day, a tradition that appears to have originated with counterculture radio host Bob Fass, who introduced the song to the public on his radio show. Another song that traditionally gets played on numerous radio stations (of many different formats) is "The Thanksgiving Song", a 1992 song by Adam Sandler.

In the beginning of the 21st century, Thanksgiving or the day after was the traditional start date when radio stations flipped to continuous Christmas music. Due to Christmas creep, this date has progressed to well before Thanksgiving for most stations that follow this strategy.

Turkey pardoning

The President of the United States has received a Thanksgiving turkey every year since 1873; for the first 41 years, the turkey was provided by Westerly, Rhode Island turkey kingpin Horace Vose. In 1947, in what began as a lobbying ploy to get President Harry Truman to stop rationing turkey for foreign aid, the National Turkey Federation has presented the President of the United States with one live turkey and two dressed turkeys in a ceremony known as the National Thanksgiving Turkey Presentation. John F. Kennedy was the first president reported to spare the turkey given to him (he said he did not plan to eat the bird); by the late 1970s, most of the turkeys were being sent to petting zoos, while the dressed turkeys are usually sent to a charity such as Martha's Table.

Some legends date the origins of pardoning turkey to the Harry Truman administration or even to Abraham Lincoln pardoning his son's Christmas turkey; both stories have been quoted in more recent presidential speeches, but neither has any evidence in the Presidential record.
In more recent years, two turkeys have been pardoned, in case the original turkey becomes unavailable for presidential pardoning.

George H. W. Bush made the turkey pardon a permanent annual tradition upon assuming the presidency in 1989, a tradition that was possibly inspired in part by a joke his predecessor Ronald Reagan had cracked during the 1987 presentation and has been carried on by every president each year since. After stints at Frying Pan Farm Park in Herndon, Virginia (1989 to 2004), the Disney Resorts (2005 to 2009), Mount Vernon (the estate of George Washington, 2010 to 2012), and Morven Park (the estate of Westmoreland Davis, 2013 to 2015), turkeys have lived the remainder of their lives in the care of agricultural departments of major universities. The turkeys rarely lived to see the next Thanksgiving due to being bred for large size; this gradually improved over the course of the 2010s as Morven Park and the universities have been more aggressive in maintaining the turkeys' health.

Vacation and travel

On Thanksgiving Day, families and friends usually gather for a large meal or dinner. Consequently, the Thanksgiving holiday weekend is one of the busiest travel periods of the year. Thanksgiving is a four-day or five-day weekend vacation for schools and colleges. Most business and government workers (78% as of 2007) are given Thanksgiving and the day after as paid holidays. Thanksgiving Eve (also known as Blackout Wednesday), the night before Thanksgiving, is one of the busiest nights of the year for bars and clubs as many college students and others return to their hometowns to reunite with friends and family.

Criticism and controversy

Much like Columbus Day, Thanksgiving is observed by some as a "National Day of Mourning", in acknowledgment of the genocide and conquest of Native Americans by colonists. Thanksgiving has long carried a distinct resonance for Native Americans, who see the holiday as an embellished story of "Pilgrims and Natives looking past their differences" to break bread. Professor R.W. Jensen of the University of Texas at Austin is somewhat harsher: "One indication of moral progress in the United States would be the replacement of Thanksgiving Day and its self-indulgent family feasting with a National Day of Atonement accompanied by a self-reflective collective fasting." Some of the controversy regarding Thanksgiving has been used to justify the Christmas creep (the act of putting up Christmas decorations before Thanksgiving). Those who sympathize with this view acknowledge it as a small minority view; author and humanist J.G. Rodwan, who does not celebrate Thanksgiving, noted
 "If you put forth the interpretation ... that touches on the dishonorable treatment of the native population that lived in what became the United States, then you are likely to be dismissed as some sort of crank".

The autobiography of Mark Twain, first published in 1924, gives the satirical opinion of Mark Twain thus:

Thanksgiving Day, a function which originated in New England two or three centuries ago when those people recognized that they really had something to be thankful for — annually, not oftener — if they had succeeded in exterminating their neighbors, the Indians, during the previous twelve months, instead of getting exterminated by their neighbors, the Indians. Thanksgiving Day became a habit, for the reason that in the course of time, as the years drifted on, it was perceived that the exterminating had ceased to be mutual and was all on the white man's side, consequently on the Lord's side; hence it was proper to thank the Lord for it and extend the usual compliments.

Since 1970, the United American Indians of New England, a protest group led by Frank "Wamsutta" James has accused the United States and European settlers of fabricating the Thanksgiving story and of whitewashing a genocide and injustice against Native Americans, and it has led a National Day of Mourning protest on Thanksgiving at Plymouth Rock in Plymouth, Massachusetts in the name of social equality and in honor of political prisoners.
 Some Native Americans hold "Unthanksgiving Day" celebrations in which they mourn the deaths of their ancestors, fast, dance, and pray. This tradition has been taking place since 1975.

The perception of Thanksgiving among Native Americans is not, however, universally negative. Tim Giago, founder of the Native American Journalists Organization, seeks to reconcile Thanksgiving with Native American traditions. He compares Thanksgiving to "wopila", a thanks-giving celebration practiced by Native Americans of the Great Plains. He wrote in The Huffington Post: "The idea of a day of Thanksgiving has been a part of the Native American landscape for centuries. The fact that it is also a national holiday for all Americans blends in perfectly with Native American traditions." He also shares personal anecdotes of Native American families coming together to celebrate Thanksgiving.
Members of the Oneida Indian Nation marched in the 2010 Macy's Thanksgiving Day Parade with a float called "The True Spirit of Thanksgiving" and have done so every year since.

In the early part of the twentieth century, the American Association for the Advancement of Atheism (4A) opposed the celebration of Thanksgiving Day, offering an alternative observance called Blamegiving Day, which was in their eyes, "a protest against Divine negligence, to be observed each year on Thanksgiving Day, on the assumption, for the day only, that God exists". Citing their view of the separation of church and state, some atheists in recent times have particularly criticized the annual recitation of Thanksgiving proclamations by the President of the United States, because these proclamations often revolve around the theme of giving thanks to God.

The move by retailers to begin holiday sales during Thanksgiving Day (as opposed to the traditional day after) has been criticized as forcing (under threat of being fired) low-end retail workers, who compose an increasing share of the nation's workforce, to work odd hours and to handle atypical, unruly crowds on a day reserved for rest. In response to this controversy, Macy's and Best Buy (both of which planned to open on Thanksgiving, even earlier than they had the year before) stated in 2014 that most of their Thanksgiving Day shifts were filled voluntarily by employees who would rather have the day after Thanksgiving off instead of Thanksgiving itself. By 2021, retailers had largely abandoned efforts to hold Thanksgiving doorbusters and returned their focus to Black Friday proper. Blue laws in several Northeastern states prevent retailers in those states from opening on Thanksgiving. Such retailers typically opened at midnight on the day after Thanksgiving.

Journalist Edward R. Murrow and producer David Lowe deliberately chose Thanksgiving weekend 1960 to release Murrow's final story for CBS News. Entitled Harvest of Shame, the hour-long documentary was designed "to shock Americans into action" in regard to the treatment of impoverished migrant workers in the country, hoping to contrast Thanksgiving dinner and its excesses with the poverty of those who picked the vegetables. Murrow acknowledged the documentary portrayed the United States from a hostile perspective and, when he left CBS to join the United States Information Agency in 1961, unsuccessfully tried to stop the special from being aired in the United Kingdom.

Date

Since being fixed on the fourth Thursday in November by law in 1941, the holiday in the United States can occur on any date from November 22 to 28. When it falls on November 22 or 23, it is not the last Thursday, but the penultimate Thursday in November. Regardless, it is the Thursday preceding the last Saturday of November.

Because Thanksgiving is a federal holiday, all United States government offices are closed and all employees are paid for that day. It is also a holiday for the New York Stock Exchange and most other financial markets and financial services companies.

Table of dates (1946–2057)
The date of Thanksgiving Day follows a 28 year cycle, broken only by century years that are not a multiple of 400 (e.g. 1900, 2100, 2200, 2300, 2500 ...). The break in the regular cycle is an effect of the leap year algorithm, which dictates that such years are common years as an adjustment for the calendar / season alignment that leap years provide. Past and future dates of celebration include:

Days after Thanksgiving

A broader period of Thanksgivingtide leads into and follows the holiday of Thanksgiving itself. The day after Thanksgiving is a holiday for some companies and most schools. In the last two decades of the 20th century, it became known as Black Friday, the beginning of the Christmas shopping season and a day for chaotic, early-morning sales at major retailers that were closed on Thanksgiving. A contrasting movement known as Buy Nothing Day originated in Canada in 1992. The day after Thanksgiving is also Native American Heritage Day, a day to pay tribute to Native Americans for their many contributions to the United States.

Small Business Saturday, a movement promoting shopping at smaller local establishments, takes place on the last Saturday in November, two days after Thanksgiving. Cyber Monday is a nickname given to the Monday following Thanksgiving; the day evolved in the early days of the Internet, when consumers returning to work took advantage of their employers' broadband Internet connections to do online shopping and retailers began offering sales to meet the demand. (Green Monday is a similar observance in Christmastide.) Giving Tuesday takes place on the Tuesday after Thanksgiving.

Literature

Poetry

 "Thanksgiving" (1909), by Florence Earle Coates.
 "Over the River and Through the Wood" (1844), by Lydia Maria Child
 "Thanksgiving Day, November 28, 1986", by William S. Burroughs in Tornado Alley.

Music

 "A Hymn of Thanksgiving" (1899), composed and written by Fanny J. Crosby and Ira D. Sankey.
 "Alice's Restaurant", a song by Arlo Guthrie on his 1967 album Alice's Restaurant, based on a true incident in his life that began on Thanksgiving Day, 1965.
 "Bless This House" (1927), a song composed and written by May Brahe and Helen Taylor.
 "Come, Ye Thankful People, Come" (1844), an English hymn written by Henry Alford.
 "For the Beauty of the Earth" (1864), an English hymn written by Folliott Sandford Pierpoint.
 "Hold My Mule" by Shirley Caesar (c.1980), later remixed as "You Name It" ("U Name It")
 "Now Thank We All Our God" (c.1636), a hymn of German origin written by Martin Rinkart.
 "Simple Gifts" (1848), a Shaker hymn attributed to Joseph Brackett.
 "Thanksgiving", a song by George Winston on his album December (1982).
 "The Thanksgiving Song", a song by Adam Sandler on his album They're All Gonna Laugh at You! (1994).
 "Thanksgiving Day Parade", a song by Dan Bern on his album New American Language (2001).
 "Thanksgiving Day", a song by Ray Davies on his album Other People's Lives (2006).
 "We Gather Together" (1597), a hymn of Dutch origin written by Adrianus Valerius.
 "We Plough the Fields and Scatter" (1782), a hymn of German origin written by Matthias Claudius.

Footnotes

References

Bibliography

Further reading

  — An hour-long history public radio program examining the roots of America's Thanksgiving rituals.
 
 
  Free audio readings of Thanksgiving proclamations by William Bradford, George Washington, and Abraham Lincoln
  Historical perspective from the Pokanoket Tribe

External links
 
 

 
Holidays and observances by scheduling (nth weekday of the month)
Public holidays in the United States
United States flag flying days
Federal holidays in the United States
American culture
Thursday observances
Native American-related controversies